Band Sar Molla Ahmad Bazar (also Romanized as Band Sar Mollā Aḩmad Bāzār) is a village in Polan Rural District, Polan District, Chabahar County, Sistan and Baluchestan Province, Iran. At the 2006 census, its population was 113, in 21 families.

References 

Populated places in Chabahar County